The Snake, the Crocodile, and the Dog is the seventh in a series of historical mystery novels, written by Elizabeth Peters and featuring fictional archaeologist and sleuth Amelia Peabody.

Plot summary
After returning from their adventure at the Lost Oasis, the Emersons try to get Nefret, their new ward, integrated into English country life. She has difficulty with the immaturity and meanness of girls her age, but is determined to learn the ways of her newly adopted culture. Nefret decides she will stay in England to study while the Emersons return to Egypt as usual in the fall, and Walter and Evelyn Emerson glady take her in. Ramses also decides to stay in England, as his crush on Nefret becomes more obvious to his mother (but no one else).

So Amelia and the Professor sail east, to begin a new season with a new project - the complete clearing of an entire archaeological site. Despite Amelia's hopes that this will be a second honeymoon for them, Emerson is kidnapped—but no ransom demand or explanation is forthcoming. Amelia, Abdullah, and their circle of friends scour Luxor for any sign of Emerson, with the help of Cyrus Vandergelt, who appears on the scene just when Amelia needs him most.

When Adbullah finally finds Emerson, imprisoned in a backyard shed, Amelia finds out that his captor wants information about their previous year's travels and the possibility of a lost Meroitic civilization (complete with artifacts and treasures to exploit). Unfortunately for the kidnapper, Emerson is the victim of amnesia and doesn't know anything about the Lost Oasis. Unfortunately for Amelia, it turns out Emerson doesn't remember her either—and is just as annoyed by her as when they first met. (See Crocodile on the Sandbank.)

Back in England, Ramses and Nefret also seem targeted for abduction, and Ramses' harrowing letters do not add to Amelia's peace of mind. Meanwhile, Cyrus is beginning to look at Amelia with more affection than she expected, but she's not going to give Emerson up without a fight.

Title
The title refers to an Egyptian fairy tale which Amelia is in the process of translating, called "The Doomed Prince", in which a young prince is destined to be killed by one of the three animals mentioned.

Awards
The novel was nominated for an Agatha Award in the "Best Novel" category in 1992.

See also

List of characters in the Amelia Peabody series

References

1994 American novels
Amelia Peabody